Short Story is a piece for violin and piano composed by George Gershwin in 1925.

Gershwin composed the duet from two other short works that premiered at the same time as his Three Preludes. He combined a section of the Novelette in Fourths and another slower work (the forgotten Rubato prelude) to create this piece.

Notes 

Instrumental duets
1927 compositions
Compositions by George Gershwin